Ladd is an unincorporated community in Augusta County, Virginia, United States. Ladd is located just outside the independent city of Waynesboro, Virginia and inside Augusta County.  Founded in 1854, the only notable buildings of Ladd left as of 2005 are the Bethlehem Lutheran Church (built 1854), the General Store, and two homes dating to the early 1900s.

References

Unincorporated communities in Augusta County, Virginia
Populated places established in 1854
Unincorporated communities in Virginia
1854 establishments in Virginia